Nguyễn Văn Hùng (born April 3, 1989) is a Vietnamese track and field athlete specializing in the triple jump. He competed in the 2009 World Championships in Athletics, failing to qualify for the final, and finished fifth in the 2009 Southeast Asian Games.

See also 
 Vietnamese records in athletics

Notes 

1989 births
Living people
Vietnamese male triple jumpers
Athletes (track and field) at the 2010 Asian Games
Athletes (track and field) at the 2014 Asian Games
Southeast Asian Games medalists in athletics
Southeast Asian Games gold medalists for Vietnam
Southeast Asian Games silver medalists for Vietnam
Southeast Asian Games bronze medalists for Vietnam
Competitors at the 2009 Southeast Asian Games
Asian Games competitors for Vietnam
20th-century Vietnamese people
21st-century Vietnamese people